Salazar is a surname meaning old hall (from Castilian Sala [hall] and Basque  zahar [old]). The name originates from the town of the same name: Salazar, in northern Burgos, Castile, Spain. Although northern Burgos is not currently a Basque-speaking region, the language was spoken there when the surname appeared there during the early Middle Ages.

Its origins are also related to a certain noble family, the Salazars, that held a fief in the area. During the 10th century, the surname appears as mentioned in Navarre, where it spread and there even exists a Salazar Valley. It later also spread to the rest of the Basque Country, being specially common in Biscay during the 15th century. During that time, Lope García de Salazar, a famous writer, took part in the Reconquista of Cuenca, where he was granted a fief and founded a notable family. Some of his descendants took part in the Conquest of the Americas, thus spreading the surname all through the Spanish Americas; others intermarried many noble families, and the surname spread all through the Iberian peninsula.

Salazar is a common in Latin America because there were a number of Salazars among the early Spanish conquerors and settlers.

Salazar is also a common surname among Roma people. Due to several censuses made in the Kingdom of Castile during the 14th and 15th centuries, every Castilian subject was forced to take a name and two surnames. The Roma, who used to call themselves only by a first name, decided to take established surnames to add prestige to their families. They chose from among the oldest noble families, usually of Basque origin, thus it is extremely common to find Roma with surnames such as Heredia, Salazar, Mendoza, or Montoya.

People

 Alexander James Salazar (work)
 Abel Salazar (actor) (1917–1995), Mexican actor, producer, and director
 Abel Salazar (scientist) (1889–1946), Portuguese physician, lecturer, researcher, writer, and painter
 Alberto Salazar (born 1958), American distance runner and athletics coach banned for life for emotional and sexual misconduct
 Alejandro Salazar (born 1984), American soccer-player
 Alexander Salazar (born 1949), Costa-Rican-American prelate of the Roman Catholic Church
 Alonso de Salazar (died 1526), Spanish explorer and discoverer of Marshall Islands
 Alonso Salazar Frias (c. 1564–1636), Spanish opponent of witch-trials
 Anaís (Ana Isabel Salazar, born 1974), Mexican actress
 Ángel Salazar (born 1956), Cuban-American comedian and actor
 Antonio de Salazar (composer) (c. 1650–1715), composer and choirmaster
 António de Oliveira Salazar (1889–1970), Portuguese academic and politician
 Antonio Sebastián de Toledo, 2nd Marquis of Mancera (c. 1608–1715), Viceroy of New Spain
 Ángel Salazar (born 1956), Cuban-American comedian and actor
 Ángel Salazar (baseball) (born 1961), former Major League Baseball shortstop
 Benjamin Salazar Jr (born 1977) Deputy State Fire Marshal Cal Fire
 Braulio Salazar (1917–2008), Venezuelan painter
 Carlos Salazar (disambiguation), Argentine politician 
 Cristina Díaz Salazar (born 1958), Mexican politician
 Diego Salazar (born 1980), Colombian weightlifter
 Domingo de Salazar (1512–1594), first bishop of Manila
 Eliseo Salazar (born 1954), Chilean racing driver
 Elsa Salazar Cade (born 1952), U.S. entomologist
 Emiliano Zapata Salazar (1879–1919), Mexican Revolution leader
 Evangelina Salazar (born 1946), Argentine actress
 Fanny Zampini Salazar (1853–1931), Belgian-born Italian writer, editor, and lecturer
 Francisco Cervantes de Salazar (1514?–1575), Spanish theologian, writer, chronicler, and rector of the University of Mexico
 Francisco Javier Salazar Sáenz, Mexican Secretary of Labor
 Francisco Salazar, Chilean handball-player
 Gabriel Salazar (born 1936), Chilean historian
 George Salazar (born 1986), American actor
 Iván Salazar (born 1998), Uruguayan soccer-player
 Jeff Salazar (born 1980), Major League Baseball outfielder
 John Salazar (born 1953), American politician
 Jorge Ibarra Salazar, Mexican economist
 José Salazar (born 1957), Venezuelan triple jumper
 José Francisco Xavier de Salazar y Mendoza (1750–1802), Mexican portrait painter
 José Gregorio Salazar (1773–1838), general, politician, president of the Federal Republic of Central America
 Juan de Oñate y Salazar (1550–1626), Spanish explorer, conquistador & governor of New Mexico
 Juan de Salazar, maestre de campo in the Arauco War
 Juana de Salazar, wife of governor of Chile Antonio de Acuña Cabrera
 Juan García de Salazar (1639–1710), Spanish composer
 Julia Salazar, American political activist
 Kenneth Salazar (born 1955), U.S. Secretary of the Interior and former U.S. Senator from the state of Colorado
 Luciana Salazar (born 1980), Argentine model and actress
 Luis Salazar (born 1956), former Major League Baseball infielder/outfielder
 Manuel Salazar y Baquíjano (1777–1850), President of Peru in 1827
 Maria Elvira Salazar (born 1961), TV anchor and Representative for Florida's 27th Congressional seat
 Martha Salazar (born 1970), American boxer
 Max Salazar (1932–2010), American journalist and writer on Latin music
 Nick Salazar (1929–2020), American politician
 Noel B. Salazar (born 1973), European sociocultural anthropologist
 Oscar Salazar (baseball) (born 1978), Major League Baseball second baseman
 Oscar Salazar (taekwondo) (born 1977), Olympic taekwondo athlete from Mexico
 Philippe-Joseph Salazar (born 1955), French philosopher and rhetorician
 Ricardo Salazar (born 1972), MLS and FIFA soccer-referee
 Richard Salazar (born 1981), Venezuelan baseball pitcher
 Roger Salazar (consultant) (born 1970), American former presidential and gubernatorial spokesperson
 Rosa Salazar (born 1985), American actress
 Rubén Salazar (1928–1970), reporter for the Los Angeles Times and KMEX-TV, Los Angeles  
 Tim Salazar, Wyoming State Senator
 Vicente Lucio Salazar (1832–1896), President of Ecuador in 1895
 Victor Salazar (1911–1985), American businessman, political figure and officeholder.
 Víctor Salazar (footballer, born 1991), Colombian soccer-player
 Víctor Salazar (footballer, born 1993), Argentine soccer-player
 Zeus A. Salazar (born 1934), a Filipino historian, anthropologist, and philosopher of history.

Fictional characters
 Armando Salazar, villain of the film Pirates of the Caribbean: Dead Men Tell No Tales
 Bennie Salazar, a central character and record company executive from the book A Visit From the Goon Squad
 Hector Salazar (disambiguation), multiple fictional characters
 King Salazar, main antagonist of the animated film Wakko's Wish
 Ramon Salazar (Resident Evil 4), from the video game Resident Evil 4
 Ramon Salazar (24 character), from the television series 24
 Rex Salazar, fictional titular protagonist of Generator Rex which the surname of his late Argentinean father Rafael.
 Rosario Salazar, from the television series Will & Grace
 Víctor Salazar, main character of the television series Love, Victor
 Salazar Slytherin, Founder of the Slytherin House Harry Potter

References

Bibliography
Euskal Abizenak, vol 3, pp 100–102. Lizardi Multimedia, Zarauz, Spain. 
RAMOS MERINO, Juan Luis. "La caballería y la leyenda artúrica en Lope García de Salazar". En: Junto al Grial : miscelánea artúrica. Soria : Diputación Provincial, 2008, pp. 89–103.

Basque-language surnames
Romani surnames
Spanish-language surnames